The Cork and Macroom Direct Railway (CMDR) was an Irish gauge railway in Ireland which ran the  from Cork to Macroom.

History

It was incorporated in 1861 and was chaired by Sir John Arnott and Joseph Ronayne. The engineer for the scheme was Sir John Benson.

Construction work started in 1863. The line cost £6,000 per mile (equivalent to £ in ) and there were five stations on the 24 miles 13 chain length. It opened on 12 May 1866 and utilised the Cork, Bandon and South Coast Railway terminus at Albert Quay.

The company wanted independence from the Cork, Bandon and South Coast Railway which was charging £2,000 per annum for the privilege, so it built a new terminus on Summerhill South road fed by a link from Ballyphehane Junction.  Cork Capwell railway station cost £28,000 (equivalent to £ in ), and opened in September 1879.  The link with the CBSCR was severed as the CMDR wished to remain independent however they were forced to re-open it by the Irish Railways Executive Committee in 1918.

In 1925, the Cork and Macroom Direct Railway was amalgamated into the Great Southern Railways (GSR) along with other Irish railway companies.  The CMDR whilst small was modestly profitable and had attempted to remain independent even again severing their link to the rest of the network but in the end their attempts were fruitless.

Powers to extend the CMDR to Kenmare had been granted but were never exercised.

Closure

The Cork Capwell terminus closed on 2 March 1925, and trains reverted to the original terminus at Albert Quay. In 1929, the Capwell station buildings were acquired by the Irish Omnibus Company.  The last regular passenger train was operated in 1935 and the line eventually closed to goods traffic in 1953 with the line officially closed in 1960.

Rolling Stock

Locomotives
The CMDR had five locomotives at the time absorption into the GSR.

Carriages and Wagons

At the time of the 1925 amalgamation the CMDR passed on 27 coaches and 117 wagons to the GSR.

Livery

In 1903 locomotives were light green with black and yellow lining.  By the 1925 amalgamation they were black with red lining.

Incidents

On 8 September 1878, there was a derailment east of  that resulted in 5 deaths and 70 injuries. This incident resulted in significant financial outlay for the company for several years.

Further reading

References

Defunct railway companies of Ireland
Transport in County Cork
Irish gauge railways
Railway companies established in 1861
Railway companies disestablished in 1953
1861 establishments in Ireland